Arabluy-e Darreh (also Romanized as ‘Arablūy-e Darreh; also known as ‘Arablū-ye Darreh) is a village in Nazluy-ye Jonubi Rural District, in the Central District of Urmia County, West Azerbaijan Province, Iran. At the 2006 census, its population was 448, in 129 families.

References 

Populated places in Urmia County